The S-IV was the second stage of the Saturn I rocket used by NASA for early flights in the Apollo program.

The S-IV was manufactured by the Douglas Aircraft Company and later modified by them to the S-IVB, a similar but distinct stage used on the Saturn IB and Saturn V rockets.

The S-IV stage was a large LOX/LH2-fueled rocket stage used for the early test flights of the Saturn I rocket. It formed the second stage of the Saturn I and was powered by a cluster of six RL-10A-3 engines. The cryogenic LH2 (liquid hydrogen) and LOX (liquid oxygen) tanks were separated by a common bulkhead. The forward bulkhead of the LOX tank formed the aft bulkhead of the LH2 tank. This saved up to 20% of structural weight.

References

Apollo program
Rocket stages